Ashley is a hamlet in the large civil parish of Bentworth in the East Hampshire district of Hampshire, England. Its nearest town is Alton, which lies approximately 4.3 miles (6.9 km) to the east.

References

Villages in Hampshire